was a Japanese daimyō of the Edo period, who ruled the Miyazu Domain.

|-

1782 births
1840 deaths
Rōjū
Daimyo
Kyoto Shoshidai